The 1982–83 Macedonian Republic League was the 39th since its establishment. FK Belasica won their 1st championship title.

Participating teams

Final table

External links
SportSport.ba
Football Federation of Macedonia 

Macedonian Football League seasons
Yugo
3